David John Edwards (born 13 January 1974) is a former English professional footballer who played as a midfielder for Walsall.

References

1974 births
Living people
Association football midfielders
Walsall F.C. players
Stafford Rangers F.C. players
People from Bridgnorth
English footballers
Sportspeople from Shropshire